Quenstedtite is an uncommon iron sulfate mineral with chemical formula Fe2(SO4)3·11H2O. It forms violet or white triclinic crystals.  Found in oxidized zones of pyrite-rich orebodies, especially in arid climates. It was first reported in 1888 for an occurrence in Tierra Amarilla, Copiapó Province, Atacama Region, Chile and named by G. Linck in 1889 for the German mineralogist F. A. von Quenstedt (1809–1889).

References

Webmineral data

Sulfate minerals
Iron(III) minerals
Triclinic minerals
Minerals in space group 2